The President John F. Kennedy Assassination Records Collection Act of 1992, or the JFK Records Act, is a public law passed by the United States Congress, effective October 26, 1992. It directed the National Archives and Records Administration (NARA) to establish a collection of records to be known as the President John F. Kennedy Assassination Records Collection. It stated that the collection shall consist of copies of all U.S. government records relating to the 1963 assassination of President John F. Kennedy, and that they are to be housed in the NARA Archives II building in College Park, Maryland. The collection also included any materials created or made available for use by, obtained by, or otherwise came into the possession of any state or local law enforcement office that provided support or assistance or performed work in connection with a federal inquiry into the assassination.

Background
The final report of the act's Assassination Records Review Board (ARRB) partially credited the conclusions in Oliver Stone's 1991 film JFK with the passage of the act. The ARRB stated that the film "popularized a version of President Kennedy's assassination that featured U.S. government agents from the Federal Bureau of Investigation (FBI), the Central Intelligence Agency (CIA), and the military as conspirators."

Requirements and process
The act requires that each assassination record be publicly disclosed in full and be made available in the collection no later than the date that is 25 years after the October 26, 1992 date of enactment (which was October 26, 2017), unless the President of the United States certifies that: (1) continued postponement is made necessary by an identifiable harm to the military defense, intelligence operations, law enforcement, or conduct of foreign relations; and (2) the identifiable harm is of such gravity that it outweighs the public interest in disclosure.

The definition of "assassination record" was left broad by the act and determined in practice by the ARRB; a final definition was published in the Federal Register on June 28, 1995. The basic definition was:

An assassination record includes, but is not limited to, all records, public and private, regardless of how labeled or identified, that document, describe, report on, analyze, or interpret activities, persons, or events reasonably related to the assassination of President John F. Kennedy and investigations of or inquiries into the assassination.

This was supplemented with coverage of all government records relating to investigations of the assassination (including those specified in Section 3(2) of the act), as well as supplementary records required to clarify meanings of other documents (such as code names used).

The ARRB determined that agencies could not object to disclosure "solely on grounds of non-relevance," stating that the ARRB is responsible for making decisions that determine relevance.

Assassination Records Review Board
The act established, as an independent agency, the Assassination Records Review Board (ARRB), to consider and render decisions when a U.S. government office sought to postpone the disclosure of assassination records. The board met for four years, from October 1, 1994 to September 30, 1998. When the act was passed in 1992, 98 percent of all Warren Commission documents had been released to the public. By the time the board disbanded, all Warren Commission documents, except income tax returns, had been released to the public, with only minor redactions.

The ARRB collected evidence starting in 1992, then produced its final report in 1998. The ARRB was not enacted to determine why or by whom the murder was committed but to collect and preserve the evidence for public scrutiny. After the enactment of the federal law that created the ARRB, the board collected a large number of documents and took testimony of those who had relevant information of the events. The Committee finished its work in 1998 and in its final report, the ARRB outlined the problems that government secrecy created regarding the murder of President Kennedy.

Some of the information was gathered by way of testimony from witnesses that had eyewitness knowledge of the events. For example, the board interviewed the physicians who treated the president's massive head wound at Parkland Hospital in Dallas. This was a highly trained team of emergency care physicians, some of whom testified in secret before the Warren Commission. These transcripts have now also been made public.  Other information consists of a large number of documents from the FBI and CIA that were required to cooperate with the turnover of relevant records held secret by these agencies.

A staff report for the Assassinations Records Review Board contended that brain photographs in the Kennedy records are not of Kennedy's brain and show much less damage than Kennedy sustained. J. Thornton Boswell, who, along with James Humes did a secondary examination of Kennedy's brain, refuted these allegations. The board also found that, conflicting with the photographic images showing no such defect, a number of witnesses, including at both the Autopsy and Parkland hospital, saw a large wound in the back of the president's head. The board and board member Jeremy Gunn have also stressed the problems with witness testimony, asking people to weigh all of the evidence, with due concern for human error, rather than take single statements as "proof" for one theory or another.

Status
By ARRB law (of 1998), all existing assassination-related documents were to be made public by October 2017. Prior to October 2017, over 35,000 documents were still not fully available (partially redacted) to the public, and among them, 3,603 were at that time unseen by the public.

In 2013, the ARRB's former chairman John R. Tunheim and former deputy director Thomas Samoluk wrote in the Boston Globe that after the ARRB had declassified 5 million documents, "There is a body of documents that the CIA is still protecting, which should be released. Relying on inaccurate representations made by the CIA in the mid-1990s, the Review Board decided that records related to a deceased CIA agent named George Joannides were not relevant to the assassination. Subsequent work by researchers, using other records that were released by the board, demonstrates that these records should be made public." Tunheim and Samoluk pointed out that the CIA had not told the Warren Commission that George Joannides was the CIA lead for the Agency's links with the anti-Castro group Oswald had a public fight with in mid-1963; nor had they told the United States House Select Committee on Assassinations (HSCA), of which Joannides was the CIA's liaison. Tunheim said in a separate interview that "It really was an example of treachery ... If [the CIA] fooled us on that, they may have fooled us on other things."

2017 releases
On July 24, 2017, the National Archives began to release the remaining documents previously withheld.

The first release included 441 FBI and CIA records which had previously been withheld in full. These records had never previously been made available to the public. Another 3,369 records were also released which had previously been withheld in part, meaning that they had previously been made public, but parts of the records had been kept back for reasons of security or privacy.  Records in the first release included 17 audio files of interviews of Yuri Nosenko, a KGB officer who claimed to have been the officer in charge of the KGB file on Lee Harvey Oswald during Oswald's stay in the Soviet Union. Nosenko defected to the U.S. in January 1964 and was extensively debriefed over a period of several years.

On October 21, 2017, US President Donald Trump stated on his Twitter account that he would allow release of the remaining documents. He tweeted: "Subject to the receipt of further information, I will be allowing, as President, the long blocked and classified JFK FILES to be opened." His statement left open the possibility that some documents could still be withheld under the JFK Records Act if their release would harm military operations, law enforcement or foreign relations.

On October 26, Trump signed a memo ordering release of all records collected under section 5 of the JFK Records Act. He gave agencies wishing to appeal release of all information in these records until April 26, 2018, to do so.

On the same day, the NARA released another 2,891 records. Most of the records in this second release were previously withheld in part.

On November 3, the NARA released another 676 documents. Most of these were previously withheld in full. According to the Mary Ferrell Foundation,  which holds a large database of records on the assassination, the majority of the records in this third release were from the CIA. These files still contain a number of redactions, which remain subject to further review under President Trump's order.

On November 9, the NARA released another 13,213 records. Most of these were previously withheld in part. According to the Mary Ferrell Foundation, the records in this fourth release were from the CIA and NSA. Some of these records were redacted in part. These redactions remain subject to further review under President Trump's order.

On November 17, the NARA released another 10,744 records, including 144 previously withheld in full and 10,600 previously withheld in part. All of the records in this fifth release were from the FBI. Some of these records were redacted in part. These redactions remain subject to further review under President Trump's order.

On December 15, the NARA released another 3,539 previously withheld documents, leaving a total of 86 still classified in full.

Later releases

On April 26, 2018, the NARA released another 19,045 documents in accordance with President Trump's order.  These releases include FBI, CIA, and other agency documents (both formerly withheld in part and formerly withheld in full) identified by the Assassination Records Review Board as assassination records. While no more documents required to be released under section 5 remain withheld in full, some still remain withheld in part.

In 2021, President Joe Biden postponed the release of remaining records, citing the COVID-19 pandemic as the reason. Future releases of documents were scheduled for December 15, 2021, and December 15, 2022. Agencies that object to releasing records before then will have to provide unclassified information detailing why the information is withheld, and a date when the information might be declassified. The initial response to the 2021 release was that it provided little new information.

On December 15, 2022 NARA released an additional 13,173 documents as ordered by President Biden.

See also
Henry Graff, Member of the ARRB
Kermit L. Hall, Member of the ARRB
John R. Tunheim, Chairman of the ARRB
David Marwell, Executive Director of the ARRB
QKENCHANT, a CIA project, first disclosed because of JFK Records Act

References

External links
 Congress.gov at the Library of Congress: JFK Records Act ~ Senate Bill 3006 
 
 
 
 
Final Report of the Assassination Records Review Board, September 1998
 Medical Testimony Before the Assassination Records Review Board
 Additional Medical Interviews Before the Assassination Records Review Board
 Master Set of Medical Exhibits Before the Assassination Records Review Board
 CIA Personnel Testimony Before the Assassination Records Review Board
 Washington D. C. 10-11-94 Persons Testimony Before the Assassination Records Review Board
 Dallas, Texas 11-18-94 Persons Testimony Before the Assassination Records Review Board
 Boston, Massachusetts 3-24-95 Persons Testimony Before the Assassination Records Review Board
 New Orleans, Louisiana 6-28-95 Persons Testimony Before the Assassination Records Review Board
 Los Angeles, California 9-17-96 Persons Testimony Before the Assassination Records Review Board
 Washington D. C. 4-2-97 Persons Testimony Before the Assassination Records Review Board
Staff Memos of the Assassination Records Review Board

102nd United States Congress
1992 in law
Assassination of John F. Kennedy